Kashish may refer to:

 Kashish Singh, Indian actress
 Kashish Mumbai Queer Film Festival in India
 Kashish (serial), a 1990s Indian romantic drama television serial broadcast on Doordarshan